Mikoyan is a Russian aircraft manufacturer. The name may also refer to:

People
 Anastas Mikoyan (1895–1978), an Old Bolshevik and Soviet statesman
 Artem Mikoyan (1905–1970), a Soviet aircraft designer of Armenian descent
 Ivan Mikoyan (1927-2016), a Russian aircraft designer,
 Sergo Mikoyan (1929–2010), Soviet historian
 Stas Namin (born Anastas Alekseyevich Mikoyan, 1951–), a Russian-Armenian musician, composer, record producer, entrepreneur, promoter, and businessman

Places
Mikoyan Bay in Severnaya Zemlya

Other
Yeghegnadzor (previously Mikoyan), the capital of the Armenian province of Vayots Dzor